Hasanabad (also Romanized as Ḩasanābād; also known as Ḩoseynābād and Qanāt-e Ḩājjī Ḩasan) is a village in Howmeh Rural District, in the Central District of Dashtestan County, Bushehr Province, Iran. At the 2006 census, its population was 67, in 11 families.

References 

Populated places in Dashtestan County